Helianthemum canadense or Crocanthemum canadense (known as longbranch frostweed, Canada frostweed, frostweed, rock frost, frostplant, or frostwort) is a species of rock-rose (Cistaceae), native to eastern North America.

Description
It is a flowering perennial  in height that blooms from May to June for a single day. Each stem normally has a single flower, but rarely can have two. The flower is yellow in color, with five petals and is between 3/4 and 1 1/4 inches across. The leaves are covered in hairs and alternate in pattern. The stems are also covered in hairs and are brown or green in color.

References

USDA, NRCS. 2019. The PLANTS Database (http://plants.usda.gov, 5 February 2019). National Plant Data Team, Greensboro, NC 27401-4901 USA.
wildflower.org
Minnesotawildflowers.info

canadense